Isogona segura is a species of moth of the family Erebidae first described by William Barnes in 1907. It is found in the US state of Arizona.

External links

Boletobiinae
Moths of North America
Moths described in 1907